Fathers and Sons ( and also known as A Tailor's Maid) is a 1957 Italian comedy film directed by Mario Monicelli. At the 7th Berlin International Film Festival Monicelli won the Silver Bear for Best Director award.

Plot 
In Italy, in the 1950s, the lives of five families intersect. Vincenzo Corallo is a widowed tailor who has no control over his teenager, Marcella, who skips school to go with her boyfriend, Sandro Bacci, older than her, in assize trials. Her son, Carlo, is the master of the family who can't stand his sister's bad manners and wants to put her back on the right track.

At the Bacci, the father, Vittorio, has problems with his eldest son.

In the same building, Guido and Giula Blasi are expecting their first child. Anxious, Guido contacts a nurse, Ines Santarelli, who offers him injections for his pregnant wife.

Ines Santarelli, married to a zookeeper, is the overworked mother of five children. She entrusts one of her sick sons to her sister Rita, happy to welcome him, because she cannot have children with her husband.

Cast
 Vittorio De Sica - Vincenzo Corallo
 Lorella De Luca - Marcella Corallo
 Riccardo Garrone - Carlo Corallo
 Marcello Mastroianni - Cesare
 Fiorella Mari - Rita
 Franco Interlenghi - Guido Blasi
 Antonella Lualdi - Giulia Blasi
 Memmo Carotenuto - Amerigo Santarelli
 Marisa Merlini - Ines Santarelli
 Ruggero Marchi - Vittorio Bacci
 Emma Baron - Missis Bacci
 Gabriele Antonini - Sandro Bacci
 Franco Di Trocchio - Alvaruccio
 Raffaele Pisu - Vezio Bacci

References

External links

Father and Sons at Variety Distribution

1957 films
1957 comedy films
Italian comedy films
1950s Italian-language films
Films directed by Mario Monicelli
Films scored by Carlo Rustichelli
Films set in Rome
Films with screenplays by Age & Scarpelli
1950s Italian films